Vishegrad is a village in Kardzhali Municipality, Kardzhali Province, southern Bulgaria.

Vishegrad Knoll on Trinity Peninsula in Antarctica is named after the village.

References

Villages in Kardzhali Province